Marcus Vinicius (c. 5 BC – AD 46) was twice Roman consul and, as husband of Julia Livilla, grandson-in-law (progener) of the emperor Tiberius. He was the son and grandson of two consuls, Publius Vinicius (consul 2 AD) and Marcus Vinicius (consul 19 BC).

Life

Born in Cales in Campania, Vinicius started his senatorial career as quaestor in AD 20. That same year, Vinicius was requested to take part in the defence of Gnaeus Calpurnius Piso for the murder of Germanicus, but refused. He was present for the trial, as his name appears as one of seven witnesses of the Senatus consultum de Cn. Pisone patre, the Roman Senate's official act concerning Piso's trial and punishment.

In 30, Vinicius was appointed to the consulship, which he held with Lucius Cassius Longinus. In the same year, Velleius Paterculus published his Histories, which he dedicated to Vinicius.

In 33, Tiberius selected him as the husband for Julia Livilla, the youngest daughter of Germanicus. On that occasion, Tacitus describes Vinicius as "mild in character and an elaborate orator".

For the term 39/40, Vinicius was proconsular governor of Asia. Prior to this he had been appointed to a committee assigned to estimate the damages caused by a fire on the Aventine Hill.

Vinicius and his nephew Lucius Annius Vinicianus were involved in the assassination of the emperor Caligula and, for a short time, even tried to be his successor to the throne.

After Claudius became emperor, Vinicius accompanied him during the Roman conquest of Britain in 43 and was awarded the ornamenta triumphalia. In 45, he was honoured with the rare distinction of a second consulship as prior consul; his colleague that year was Titus Statilius Taurus Corvinus.

At Messalina's instigation, Vinicius was killed in 46. He nevertheless received a state funeral.

Appearance in fiction
 The lead character in the novel Quo Vadis by Henryk Sienkiewicz, also named Marcus Vinicius, is the fictional son of the historical Marcus Vinicius.

References

Secondary sources
Syme, Ronald (1939). The Roman Revolution. Oxford: Clarendon Press.
Vogel-Weidemann, Ursula (1982). Die Statthalter von Africa und Asia in den Jahren 14-68 n. Chr.: Eine Untersuchung zum Verhältnis Princeps und Senat. Bonn: Habelt.

0s BC births
46 deaths
Year of birth uncertain
1st-century BC Romans
1st-century Romans
Ancient Roman generals
Senators of the Roman Empire
Imperial Roman consuls
Roman governors of Asia
Julio-Claudian dynasty
Vinicius, Marcus (AD 30)